Nebria complanata is a species of ground beetle native to West and South Europe.
It is a coastal species predatory on Talitrus saltator and Talorchestia brito.

References

complanata
Beetles described in 1767
Taxa named by Carl Linnaeus
Beetles of Europe